The Serie B 1996–97 was the sixty-fifth tournament of this competition played in Italy since its creation.

Teams
Ravenna, Empoli, Lecce and Castel di Sangro had been promoted from Serie C, while Bari, Torino, Cremonese and Padova had been relegated from Serie A.

Final classification

Results

Serie B seasons
2
Italy